Massimiliano Varricchio (born 14 November 1976) is an Italian footballer. He currently plays as a forward for A.C. Cuneo 1905.

References

1976 births
Living people
Italian footballers
Calcio Padova players
A.C. Cuneo 1905 players
A.C. Prato players
S.S.C. Napoli players
Treviso F.B.C. 1993 players
Cosenza Calcio 1914 players
Pisa S.C. players
Delfino Pescara 1936 players
Spezia Calcio players
U.S. Cremonese players
Association football forwards